Declination is a noun form of the verb decline and may refer to:

 Declination, coordinate used in astronomy
 Magnetic declination, angle that must be added or subtracted in the use of compass for geography
 Grid declination, angle between the compass north and north direction of the map coordinate grid
 Clinamen, a concept in early atomic theory

See also
 Declension, use of case in linguistics
 Decline (disambiguation)